David Lee Edwards (born March 31, 1962) is a former American football defensive back who played for three seasons in the National Football League (NFL) with the Pittsburgh Steelers. He played college football at the University of Illinois for the Illinois Fighting Illini football team.

References

1962 births
Living people
People from Coweta County, Georgia
Sportspeople from the Atlanta metropolitan area
Players of American football from Georgia (U.S. state)
American football defensive backs
Illinois Fighting Illini football players
Pittsburgh Steelers players
National Football League replacement players